is a Japanese musician, songwriter and guitarist. He first became known as a member of the influential rock band Happy End in the early 1970s, before starting a solo career and becoming a prolific session musician. As of 2006, Suzuki had contributed to 588 recordings. In 2019, Suzuki's high school band Skye reunited and released their first album.

Biography
Before being invited to join Happy End in 1969, Suzuki was in a band called  with his high school classmates Tatsuo Hayashi and Ray Ohara (Sadistic Mika Band). Happy End produced three albums, Happy End (1970), Kazemachi Roman (1971) and Happy End (1973), before officially disbanding on New Year's Eve 1972. Suzuki and Haruomi Hosono then formed  with Hayashi, Masataka Matsutoya and Hiroshi Sato in 1973. They changed their name to  a year later.

Suzuki released his first solo album, Band Wagon which was recorded in Los Angeles with musicians from notable acts such as Little Feat, Santana and Sly and the Family Stone, in 1975. To tour the record, he formed the band  with Sato, bassist Akihiro Tanaka and drummer Toshiaki Hayashi. The group played around 10 shows, before disbanding on November 16, 1975.

Suzuki, Hosono and Hayashi reformed Tin Pan Alley, dropping the "Alley" from the name, for an album in 2000.

On February 17, 2009, Suzuki was arrested by the Tokyo Wangan Police Station for violating the Cannabis Control Law. He received a six month prison sentence suspended for three years on March 17.

To celebrate his 40th anniversary as a solo artist, Suzuki teamed up with Ino Hidefumi for two concerts on April 3 and 4, 2015. They performed twice each day and were backed by Hayashi and Hama Okamoto.

Suzuki supported Yumi Matsutoya at the 69th NHK Kōhaku Uta Gassen at the end of 2018. When Ohara invited Suzuki and Tatsuo Hayashi to record with Shirō Sano in 2019, the three decided to reunite their high school band Skye. Adding Matsutoya to the line-up, they released the album Kindan no Kajitsu with Sano in September 2019. In 2020, Fender released Suzuki's signature model guitar, the "Shigeru Suzuki '62 Stratocaster Journeyman Relic". In June, he released the song  with Chu Kosaka under the name . Skye's self-titled first album was released in October 2021.

Discography
Solo studio albums
Band Wagon (1975)

Lagoon (1976)
Caution! (1978)
Telescope (1978)
Cosmos '51 (1979)
White Heat (1979)
Sei Do Ya (1985)

With Tin Pan Alley

Tin Pan Alley 2 (1977)

Tin Pan (2000)

With Skye

Skye (2021)

CBS/Sony Sound Image Series
Pacific (1978) with Haruomi Hosono and Tatsuro Yamashita
New York (1978) with various artists
Island Music (1983) with Hosono, Yamashita, Ryuichi Sakamoto, Masataka Matsutoya and Takahiko Ishikawa
Off Shore (1983) with Hosono, Yamashita, Sakamoto, Matsutoya, Masaki Matsubara and Kazumasa Akiyama

References

External links 
 

Living people
1951 births
20th-century Japanese guitarists
20th-century Japanese male singers
20th-century Japanese singers
21st-century Japanese guitarists
21st-century Japanese male singers
21st-century Japanese singers
Japanese songwriters
Japanese rock guitarists
Japanese male rock singers
Musicians from Setagaya
Happy End (band) members